Miguel D. Pedrorena served in the California legislature and as a mayor of San Diego. During the Mexican–American War he served in the US Army.

References

American military personnel of the Mexican–American War
Members of the California State Legislature
Year of birth missing
Year of death missing